Kipp Coulee is located in Southern Alberta, Canada.

See also

 List of coulees in Alberta
 List of lakes in Alberta
 Geography of Alberta
 Coulee

Coulees of Alberta
County of Warner No. 5